The Delta Sweete is the second studio album by American singer-songwriter Bobbie Gentry. It was released on February 5, 1968, by Capitol Records. The album was produced by Kelly Gordon.

Background
One week after "Ode to Billie Joe" concluded its four-week reign at the top of the Billboard Hot 100, Gentry returned home to the South. September 30, 1967 was declared "Bobbie Gentry Day" in Houston, Mississippi, which is the county seat of Chickasaw County. It was estimated that 5,000 people attended. Life magazine turned up to interview Gentry for a feature story that would appear in the November issue accompanied by a photograph of Gentry on the Tallahatchie Bridge. Gentry returned to California the following month to begin work on her second album.

Recording
The earliest recording on the album, "Penduli Pendulum", was recorded on July 16, 1967, during one of Gentry's first sessions at Capitol Studios after being signed to Capitol Records. "Okolona River Bottom Band" and "Courtyard" were recorded on October 5. "Big Boss Man" and "Parchman Farm" were recorded on November 4, with "Big Boss Man" being overdubbed on December 13. The most productive session for the album took place on November 11, yielding "Sermon", "Reunion", "Refractions", "Mornin' Glory", and "Jesse 'Lisabeth". The last three titles would be overdubbed on December 7. The final two tracks recorded for the album were "Louisiana Man" and "Tobacco Road" on December 12.

Title and artwork
The Sweete in the album's title is a play on words, referring to both Gentry's southern-belle good looks (a pretty girl in the South might be called a "sweete") and the album's suite structure.

The cover art is evocative of the music on the record. It features a double exposure of a black and white close up of Gentry's face superimposed over a color photo of a shack on Gentry's grandparent's farm where she grew up.

Content
The Delta Sweete is a concept album based on modern life in the Deep South. Gentry wrote eight of the album's 12 tracks, which detail her Mississippi childhood and includes vignettes of home and church life ("Reunion" and "Sermon"), as well as recollections of blues and country hits she heard as a youngster ("Big Boss Man" and "Tobacco Road"). The song "Okolona River Bottom Band", accented by a sophisticated horn chart and breathy strings, used the same basic cadence as "Ode to Billie Joe".

Recording sessions for the album emphasized the unique sound of Gentry's guitar picking and her singing and phrasing styles. The prevailing sound on the album was a swampy, folk-tinged combination of blues and country, with uptown touches like strings and horns seemingly added to reflect the then modern styles of soul music and the Nashville sound.

The album opens with "Okolona River Bottom Band", a swampy southern groove featuring an intricate horn arrangement from Jimmie Haskell and Shorty Rogers. A cover of "Big Boss Man" follows. Gentry infuses the song with a little innuendo as she tells the audience with a small laugh, about finding her own boss "that's gonna treat me right". Track three, "Reunion", featuring Ramblin' Jack Elliott, is another Gentry original which paints the picture of a family bickering around the dinner table. It features a proto-rap structure to the rhythm of jump rope games from Gentry's childhood. "Parchman Farm" is a cover of a song by Mose Allison, which was itself a modified version of a song by Bukka White. The chain-gang lament blends into Gentry's Delta landscape perfectly. Track five is the sensual "Mornin' Glory", a Gentry original. Side one closes with "Sermon", an idiosyncratic take on the traditional gospel tune "Run On", making it seem menacing and perversely joyous at the same time.

The second half of the album begins with a cover of the bittersweet "Tobacco Road", performed in a cinematic style featuring a Mariachi band sound and strings. Track eight, Penduli Pendulum", is a perplexing psychedelic listening experience. "Jesse' Lisabeth" is a tender folk fable that exudes a foreboding feeling. "Refractions" is an eerie chamber pop number about a crystal bird suspended in the air, unable to land because its legs are broken. Track eleven is a cover of "Louisiana Man", and it is the only track that seems out of place on the record, due to its geographic departure from the album's title and theme. The album closes with "Courtyard", the story of a woman suffocated by luxury and imprisoned by the empty promises of her lover.

Critical reception

The album received positive reviews upon its release. Billboard said that while "Gentry's last album skyrocketed to the top of the albums chart, this one is not going to even approach that one in sales." The review went on to praise Gentry's singing as "fine", which should still result in "respectable sales."

Cashbox praised the album, saying that Gentry had "survived the storm and her second album is better than her first." They felt that Gentry's songwriting on the album showed her as "an effective ballad writer as well as a skillful portrayer of the life of the Mississippi Delta country."

Stephen Cook from AllMusic gave the album four and a half out of five stars. He praised the album, describing it as "a swampy, folk-tinged combination of blues and country, with uptown touches."

Commercial performance
Despite receiving positive reviews from music critics, the album only managed to peak at number 132 on the Billboard Top LPs chart. The album fared a little better on the Cashbox charts, peaking at number 72 on the Top 100 Albums chart and number 26 on the Top Country Albums chart. When asked by NME about the under-performance of the album, Gentry replied, "I didn't lose any sleep over it. I've never tried to second-guess public taste. If I were just a performer and not a writer, I might have felt more insecure about the whole thing."

The album's first single, "Okolona River Bottom Band", was released in November 1967. It peaked at number 54 on the Billboard Hot 100 and at number 49 in Canada on the RPM Top Singles chart.

Released in March 1968, the second single, "Louisiana Man", peaked at number 100 on the Billboard Hot 100, number 72 on the Billboard Hot Country Singles chart and number 23 on Australia's Kent Music Report Singles Chart.

In May 1968, "Refractions" and "Big Boss Man", were released in Japan and France, respectively. Both singles failed to chart.

Legacy
In 2019, Mercury Rev released Bobbie Gentry's The Delta Sweete Revisited, featuring guest performances by Norah Jones, Hope Sandoval and Marissa Nadler among others. Lucinda Williams contributed a cover of "Ode to Billie Joe", the only song featured on the album that did not originate from The Delta Sweete.

Reissues
The album was reissued in the US in 1971 by Capitol Records under the title Tobacco Road. This release omits the tracks "Big Boss Man" and "Parchman Farm", reorders the track listing and features new cover art. The album was reissued in the UK in 1972 by EMI's budget label mfp, under the title Way Down South, featuring the original track listing and new cover art.

Australian label Raven Records released the album on CD for the first time in 2006, paired with 1968’s Local Gentry. The album was made available for digital download in 2007.

A deluxe edition of the album was released on July 31, 2020, featuring a new stereo mix of the album by Andrew Batt, (who also co-produced the re-issue) sourced from the surviving four-track and eight-track tapes, along with the original mono mix. The deluxe edition will include 10 bonus tracks, featuring the previously unreleased demo "The Way I Do" and an instrumental version of "Okolona River Bottom Band".

Track listing
All tracks written by Bobbie Gentry, except where noted.

Original release (1968), Way Down South (1972)

Tobacco Road (1971)

Deluxe Edition (2020)

Personnel
Adapted from the 2020 reissue liner notes.

Bobbie Gentry – vocals
Kelly Gordon – producer

Rhythm section
Dale Anderson – mallets, timpani
Max Bennett – fender bass, electric bass, string bass
Hal Blaine – drums, congas, chimes
Raymond Brown – fender bass
Dennis Budimir – bells, percussion
James Burton – guitar
Michael Casey – electric guitar
George Fields – harmonica, cross harp
Bobbie Gentry – rhythm arrangements, acoustic guitar, vibes, keyboards, Ondes Martenot
Clifford A. Hils – bass
Del Kacher – guitar
Harry Middlebrooks – hambone percussion
Oliver E. Mitchell – drums, congas, mallets
Earl Palmer – Latin percussion
Chester Ricord – timpani

Horn section
Louis Blackburn – trombone
Harold Diner – trombone
Richard Leith – trombone
Gail Martin – trombone
Law McCreary – trombone
Oliver Mitchell – trumpet
Shorty Rogers – horn arrangements, trumpet, bass trumpet
Jack Sheldon – trumpet
Kenneth Shroyer – trombone
Anthony Terran – trumpet

String section
Benjamin Barrett – conductor
Harry Bluestone – violin
Henry Both – violin
Jesse Ehrlich – cello
James Getsoff – violin, viola
Jimmie Haskell – string arrangements
Armand Kaproff – cello
Raphael Kraemer – cello
William Kurasch – violin
Anne Leadman – cello
Leonard Malarsky – violin
Harry L. Roth – violin
Joseph Saxon – cello
Sidney Sharp – violin, viola
Paul Shure – violin
Marshall Sosson – violin
Tibor Zelig – violin

Charts
Album

Singles

References

1968 albums
Bobbie Gentry albums
Albums arranged by Jimmie Haskell
Albums arranged by Shorty Rogers
Capitol Records albums
Albums recorded at Capitol Studios